Marios Ploritis (real name: Marios Papadopoulos, 19 January 1919 – 29 December 2006) was a Greek reporter, pamphleteer, critic, translator, litterateur and theatrical director.

Biography 
Marios Ploritis was born in Piraeus and held a degree in law, economics and political sciences from the University of Athens. He studied theater in England, France and the USA. He worked as a theater and cinema critic on the newspaper "Ελευθερία" (freedom) (1945-1965), theatrical director of the National Radio Foundation (1950-1952), theatrical history professor at the dramatic school of the Art Theater (1956-1967)  and professor of the Vinsennes University of Paris. He was among the founders of the Art Theater, along with Karolos Koun. He directed nearly 20 theatrical plays in various athenian troupes, mostly between 1952 and 1962. Since 1971, he worked as a professor of theatrology in the University of Athens.

Ploritis' translational and critical work is very important. His weekly articles-epiphyllides on Vima tis Kyriakis and on various magazines bear a good reputation until today. He was the editor-in-chief of the newspaper I Niki (1965-1967) and from 1974 onwards. He was a member of Union of Editors of Daily Newspapers of Athens, of the Society of Playwrights, the Theatrical Critics Union, the Cinema Critics Union, the Hellenic Theatrical Center, the Center for the Treatment of Dependent Persons and other associations and organizations. Furthermore, Ploritis co-founded Ikaros editions along with Alekos Patsifas and Nikolaos Karidis.

Marios Ploritis had three marriages: One to actress Elli Lambeti in 1950 (they divorced in 1953), second to Marika Anemogianni in 1964 and third in 1996 to Katia Dandoulaki (with whom he was already a couple for many years, they lived together a total of 35 years, according to her words in an interview she gave). His companion was also the popular Greek actress, Aliki Vougiouklaki. He was a permanent resident of Athens and also spoke French, English, German and Italian.

Author's work 

Marios Ploritis wrote the following books:

 Faces of modern drama (1965, fourth edition 1978)
 Plumes and Traps (1966)
 The Masks (1967)
 Maximum Course (1975)
 Politics ΄B and ΄C (1980)
 Brecht and Hitler (1984)
 Art, Language and Power (1989)
 Of the stage and art (1990)
 New Politics A and B (1990)
 Mime and Mime (1990)
 Love of Freedom and Democracy (1992)

He also translated the following works: Rilke's Letters to a New Poet (1943), Brecht's Poems (1978) and a about 120 plays by international authors.

Recognition 

 A stamp in the shape of Ploritis was issued in 2015 in the commemorative series of ELTA stamps "100 years since the foundation of ESIEA".

Referrals

Sources 

 Dictionary of modern Greek literature: Persons - Works - Currents - Terms, published by Patakis, Athens 2007. Original title: Λεξικό νεοελληνικής λογοτεχνίας: Πρόσωπα - Έργα - Ρεύματα - Όροι'', εκδ. Πατάκης, Αθήνα 2007

Greek translators
Greek writers
Greek theatre directors
Greek film critics
Greek journalists
1919 births
2006 deaths
Writers from Piraeus